Salvatore Domenico Antonio Pogliese (born 3 March 1972) is an Italian politician, Mayor of Catania from 2018 to 2022.

Biography 
Pogliese graduated in Economy at the University of Catania and has been a chartered accountant. He entered in politics when he was very young, beginning his political career in the Fronte della Gioventù (Youth Front), the youth organization of the Italian Social Movement, of which Pogliese has been provincial secretary in Catania. With the end of the MSI and the birth of National Alliance, Pogliese became the regional secretary of Youth Action, the youth organization of Gianfranco Fini's party in Sicily.

In 1997 he was elected to the City Council of Catania and in 2003 he was elected to the Provincial Council, working as assessor in the junta led by Raffaele Lombardo. He is elected to the Sicilian Regional Assembly in the regional elections of 2006 with National Alliance and in the regional elections of 2008 with The People of Freedom. Re-elected in the regional elections of 2012, he became vice-president of the Sicilian Regional Assembly.

During the 2014 European election, Pogliese in elected to the European Parliament with Forza Italia.

In February 2018, Pogliese announced his intention to run for Mayor of Catania, receiving support from his own party and the whole centre-right coalition and from President of Sicily Nello Musumeci. In June 2018, Pogliese is elected Mayor, defeating his incumbent predecessor Enzo Bianco.

References 

1972 births
Living people
Italian Social Movement politicians
National Alliance (Italy) politicians
The People of Freedom politicians
Forza Italia (2013) politicians
21st-century Italian politicians
Mayors of Catania
MEPs for Italy 2014–2019